Ken Sluman (May 15, 1924 – July 21, 1991) was a Canadian football player who played for the Edmonton Eskimos and Calgary Stampeders.

References

1924 births
1991 deaths
Canadian football ends
Calgary Stampeders players
Edmonton Elks players